This is a list of indigenous territories in Brazil organised by state.

Acre

Alagoas

Amazonas

Amapá

Bahia

Ceará

Distrito Federal

Espirito Santo

Goiás

Maranhão

Minas Gerais

Mato Grosso do Sul

Mato Grosso

Pará

Paraíba

Pernambuco

Paraná

Rio de Janeiro

Rio Grande do Norte

Rondônia

Roraima

Rio Grande do Sul

Santa Catarina

Sergipe

São Paulo

Tocantins

See also
 List of indigenous peoples of Brazil

References

External links
 Terras Indígenas no Brasil, Instituto Socioambiental

Indigenous territories